Trstěnice  is a municipality and village in Svitavy District in the Pardubice Region of the Czech Republic. It has about 500 inhabitants.

History

The first written mention of Trstěnice is from 993. The village gave its name to the Trstěnice Route, which was an important medieval trade route that connected Bohemia and Moravia.

Sights
The Church of the Finding of the Holy Cross was first documented in 1350. It is originally a Gothic building, later baroquized. A bell tower from 1690 stands next to it separately. It is one of the most valuable fortificated church complexes in Bohemia.

References

External links

Villages in Svitavy District